The enduring popularity of the Star Trek science fiction franchise has led to numerous games in many different formats, beginning in 1967 with a board game based on The Original Series and continuing through the present with online and DVD games.

Board games 
 Space Checkers, a variant of Tri-dimensional chess, produced by Pacific Game Co (1965)
 Star Trek Game, the only game based on the original series to be released during the show's run, produced by Ideal Toys (1967)
 Star Trek game, produced by Hasbro (1974)
 Star Trek game, produced in UK by Palitoy (1975)
 Star Trek game, produced by Milton Bradley, based on Star Trek: The Motion Picture (1979)
 Star Trek: Starfleet Game, a promotional game released by McDonald's to coincide with the first movie (1979)
 Struggle for the Throne, produced by FASA (1984). Players control factions fighting in a succession crisis in the Klingon Empire.
 Star Trek: The Adventure Game, produced by West End Games (1985)
 Star Trek: The Enterprise 4 Encounter, produced by West End Games (1985)
 Golden Trivia Game: Star Trek Edition (1985), Golden Books
 Golden Trivia Cards: Star Trek Edition (1985)
 Star Trek: The Game, produced by Classic Games (1992)
 Star Trek: The Final Frontier, produced by Toys & Games Limited (1992)
 The Star Trek Trivia Game, Board game based on the original series, created by Terry W. Hill of Ogden, Utah, limited edition custom made and privately produced. 1992–Present)
 How to Host a Mystery - Star Trek: The Next Generation, produced by Decipher in the U.S. and Canada Games in Canada (1992)
 Star Trek: The Next Generation Interactive VCR Board Game – A Klingon Challenge, the only Star Trek: The Next Generation video board game, although a second game involving Q and The Borg was planned. This game was produced by Decipher (1993)
 Star Trek: The Next Generation: Romulan Challenge, produced by MMG LTD (1994)
 Trivial Pursuit: Star Trek Edition VCR Game, a "Sci-Fi Master Game" supplement for the main game, made by TelStar Video Entertainment (1995)
 Monopoly, produced by Hasbro licensee USAopoly in three versions; one representing the original Star Trek series (2000), another featuring Star Trek: The Next Generation (1998), and Star Trek: Continuum Edition Monopoly, covering all five series (2009)
 All About Trivia: Star Trek, released by Fundex Games. A trivia game with material specifically based on The Original Series and the first six feature films (2009)
 Scene It? Star Trek, developed by Screenlife Games and Mattel. Contains Star Trek TV and movie clips from all 5 live action series and the first 10 movies (2009)
 Star Trek: Expeditions, developed by Reiner Knizia and WizKids, taking place in the new continuity established by the latest movie (2011)
 Star Trek: Fleet Captains, developed by WizKids, a tactical game where players create fleets out of a selection of Federation and Klingon ships and battle to control hex based sectors (2011)
 Star Trek Catan, created by Mayfair Games, is a TOS themed version of the board game The Settlers of Catan (2012)
 Star Trek: Ascendancy, published by GaleForce 9, is a 4X strategy game, (2016)
 Star Trek Panic, published by USAopoly (with Fireside Games) in 2016. A cooperative game based on Castle Panic that uses Star Trek themed enemies and player characters to complete missions before the U.S.S. Enterprise is destroyed.

Tabletop wargames 
 Star Trek Battle Manual, designed and published by Lou Zocchi in 1972. Unlike most other games in this category, it was played without a board. Ships maneuvered on the tabletop using rulers to determine range and protractor-like angle measures on the large counters to determine facing. The game was produced without authorization from Paramount Pictures, leading to its reissue in 1973 as the Alien Space Battle Manual with all Star Trek references removed, followed by a further release in 1977 as the Star Fleet Battle Manual after Zochi obtained a license from Franz Joseph Designs for material in the Star Fleet Technical Manual.
 Star Fleet Battles, the seminal tactical tabletop wargame created by Steven V. Cole and produced by Task Force Games in 1979. Like Zocchi's Star Fleet Battle Manual, it also made use of a license from Franz Joseph Designs. It has had four major editions and is currently published by Amarillo Design Bureau, Inc.
 Federation Commander, a more streamlined tactical tabletop wargame in the Star Fleet Universe produced by Amarillo Design Bureau, Inc. in 2005.
 A Call To Arms: Star Fleet is another hexless game (using miniatures) set in the Star Fleet Universe. Published in 2011, it is a collaboration between Amarillo Design Bureau and Mongoose Publishing, using a variant of the system seen in Babylon 5: A Call To Arms.
 Federation Space, a strategic companion to Star Fleet Battles produced by Task Force Games in 1981.
 Federation and Empire, the second and more elaborate strategic game set in the Star Fleet Universe, first published by Task Force Games in 1986 and presently by Amarillo Design Bureau, Inc.
 The Star Trek II: Starship Combat Simulator, Star Trek III Starship Combat Roleplaying Game, and Star Trek: Starship Tactical Combat Simulator, all published by FASA Corporation in the 1980s, based on the combat system from the Star Trek: The Role Playing Game
 Star Trek: Attack Wing, published by Wizkids in 2013, and based on the "FlightPath maneuver system" from the Star Wars: X-Wing Miniatures Game under license from Fantasy Flight Games.

Card games 
 Star Trek Customizable Card Game, produced by Decipher.
 Star Trek: The Card Game, produced by Fleer.
 Star Trek: Deck Building Game, produced by Bandai. It consists of three stand-alone, integrable editions: Star Trek Deck Building Game: The Next Generation (2011), Star Trek Deck Building Game: The Next Generation – Next Phase (2012) and Star Trek Deck Building Game: The Original Series (2012)
 Star Fleet Battle Force, produced by Amarillo Design Bureau, Inc.
 Star Trek Adversaries, produced by Puppetmaster Games
 Star Trek Fluxx, published in 2018 by Looney Labs with Gale Force 9
 Star Trek TNG Fluxx, published in 2018 by Looney Labs with Gale Force 9
 Star Trek Deep Space Nine Fluxx, to be published in 2019 by Looney Labs with Gale Force 9
 ChronoTrek, a time travel game similar to Chrononauts set in the Star Trek universe, published in 2019 by Looney Labs

Role-playing games 
Official game titles include the following:
 Star Trek: Adventure Gaming in the Final Frontier, produced by Heritage Models (1978)
 Starfleet Voyages, produced by Terra Games Company (1982)
 Star Trek: The Role Playing Game, the original Star Trek RPG produced by FASA (1982)
 Enterprise: Role Play Game in Star Trek, released in Japan (only) by Tsukuda Hobby (1983)
 Prime Directive, designed by Amarillo Design Bureau, Inc. and published by Task Force Games (1993). Later editions were produced for the GURPS 3rd edition (2002), 4th edition (2005), d20 (2005) and d20 Modern (2008).
 Star Trek: The Next Generation Role-playing Game, produced by Last Unicorn Games (1998) and derived in two other standalone games:
Star Trek: Deep Space Nine Role-playing Game (1999)
Star Trek: The Original Series Role-playing Game (1999)
 Star Trek Roleplaying Game, produced by Decipher, Inc. (2002)
 Star Trek Adventures, produced by Modiphius Entertainment (2017)
 Star Trek Simulation Forum, has served as the chat based role-playing game of the official Star Trek website since October 2002. Remains the only simming organization currently recognized by the site (2002)

Starship simulator games 

Starship simulator games create the experience of commanding and operating a starship, and usually allow the player to handle a variety of functions, and to allocate resources such as ship power and systems. Some early Star Trek games in this category have had a huge effect on subsequent games in their genre, often leading to new level of depth and complexity in programming and/or gameplay.

This game category includes both computer games and non-computer board games, since the Star Fleet Battles game series provides a starship simulation, and is wholly a tabletop board wargame. As well as the Star Trek RPG by FASA which allowed players to take charge of specific areas of a ship's functions (such as the engineer allocating power) during combat.

Star Fleet Battles is different from most other wargames, which usually indicate unit strengths with simple numerical ratings. SFB players are able to deploy and manage power for a variety of ship weapons and resources. This is done via an elaborate Energy Allocation mechanism where even partial points of energy can be allocated to a number of different systems. Federation Commander is the continued development of this system in a more fast-paced version. Instead of the Energy Allocation system, it uses an innovative tick sheet system, which manages power use for each ship, and also tracks which weapons and systems are in use. The Star Trek: Starfleet Command computer game is based upon Star Fleet Battles.

In Star Trek: The Role Playing Game, produced by FASA, players actually had individual bridge functions during combat. This at one point became a separate game known as Starship Tactical Combat Simulator. The Captain determined the strategy, the Engineer was responsible for power management and allocation to different systems such as weapons and shields, the Helmsman for firing weapons, the Navigator for managing deflector shields, the Communications Officer for damage control and so on.

Starship simulator computer games which are set in the Star Trek universe occupy a large role in the history of computer games. Some of the earliest and more influential space simulator video games were Star Trek simulations designed to run on mainframes.

David H. Ahl played such games in the late 1960s at Carnegie Mellon University and the University of California, Berkeley. He stated that they were much less sophisticated than Mike Mayfield's Star Trek text game, which originated as a BASIC program on an SDS Sigma 7 mainframe system in 1971 and ported to many different systems. Ahl published source code for this game in his best selling BASIC Computer Games, and variants of the game spread widely to personal computer systems.

Decwar in 1978 was also a groundbreaking game. Another is Super Star Trek, an early text-based, DOS-based game. This game created an impressive starship experience using only text-based commands and graphics. The game Begin is considered notable for having a convincing model of game dynamics, as it has very few random elements, and is highly mathematical. In 1986, the game Multi-Trek (MTrek) was brought online at the University of California, Santa Cruz. Written in C for a PDP mainframe, and also available via dialup and later TELNET, MTrek was arguably the first ever game to combine a persistent world, online multiplayer environment with a real-time, true 3-dimensional game engine and versions of the game still have an active player base.

Netrek was released in 1988, and was probably the first game to use both the TCP and UDP protocols, the first Internet-aware team game, the first Internet game to use metaservers to locate open game servers, and the first to have persistent user information. Netrek should not be confused with NET TREK, a 1984 Macintosh game unofficially based on Star Trek.

In later years, fewer games were produced within this genre, and more games were produced in the adventure games genre. The first new recent game was Starfleet Academy, which incorporated many Star Trek elements, but was criticized for depicting starship operation as more akin to fighter planes than capital ships. A sequel, Klingon Academy, was actually quite different, and was one of the first games to depict starship operation with an appropriate amount of complexity.

The Starfleet Command game series released by Interplay was based largely on the tabletop game Star Fleet Battles, and comprised Starfleet Command, Starfleet Command II: Empires at War, and Starfleet Command III. It constitutes one of the most definitive current games, depicting a wide array of ship systems and Star Trek storylines. This series had a more naval flavor, and depicted a number of ship systems. This series spawned a very large multiplayer ladder competition first with the "Starlance" system, and later on the "GamerZone" ladder. The main multiplayer setting is the "Dynaverse," which began as an official server hosted by Taldren, and has continued as a private effort (an earlier, unauthorized adaptation of Star Fleet Battles as a computer game was SSI's The Warp Factor in 1982).

Star Trek: Bridge Commander was another addition to this genre, reflecting the more deliberative, command aspects of this experience.

In late 2006, Bethesda Softworks released several console games which carry on the tradition of classic Star Trek ship simulator/combat games, Star Trek: Legacy for the PC and Xbox 360, Star Trek: Encounters for the PlayStation 2, Star Trek: Tactical Assault for the Nintendo DS and the PlayStation Portable and Star Trek: Conquest for the Wii and PlayStation 2.

Several online games have appeared on the Internet. Vega Trek is a game mod which is planned to eventually become active as a multiplayer game. Flashtrek: Broken Mirror, first created by Vex Xiang, is one of the online Star Trek games, and is entirely browser-based. It has spawned several sequels. One sequel was created by Vex Xiang, and multiple others were created by fans. A newer game titled Star Trek: Broken Mirror was being developed by a man named Darkwing for several years, but was apparently abandoned in 2014.

Star Trek: Bridge Crew is one of the newest additions to this genre, and continues the historical pattern of Star Trek-themed simulator breaking new ground. This cross platform game is in a virtual reality environment in which four players actually occupy the bridge of the USS Aegis, Enterprise-D (Through Downloadable Content) or the Original Enterprise. Players get to see each other in real-time, and interact during the game to operate the ship and work together to handle various game scenarios.

Pinball games 
Four pinball games have been based on the Star Trek series:
Star Trek, released by Bally in 1979, designed by Gary Gayton with artwork by Kevin O'Connor.
Star Trek: 25th Anniversary, released by Data East Pinball (now Stern Pinball) in 1991.
Star Trek: The Next Generation, created by legendary pinball designer Steve Ritchie and released by Williams Electronics in November 1993 as part of Williams' SuperPin series.
Star Trek, created by Steve Ritchie and released by Stern in winter 2013.

Video games

Arcade

Computer 
The history of the Star Trek personal computer game franchise began as early as 1971, with a Star Trek text-only computer game written in BASIC. Many PC titles have since been published, and the franchise was one of the first based on a TV program to break into the young PC gamer market in the 1990s. Activision and Viacom signed an agreement to develop games based on the Star Trek property in September 1998

Interplay, Simon & Schuster, MicroProse and Activision released most of the best-known Star Trek games between 2000 and 2003. Titles like Star Trek: Armada, Star Trek: Elite Force and Star Trek: Bridge Commander were all published during this period, as were over half of all the other major Star Trek PC games. The absence of new titles after 2003 was due in large measure to a split and subsequent lawsuit between Activision and Viacom which ended in 2004.

With the departure of Activision in 2003, the franchise under the tenure of Paramount effectively came to a close. Since the end of 2005, CBS has assumed most franchise management, including games and other products. Even with no new licensed titles released during 2003-2006, the older games like Armada and Elite Force still have an avid fan base which keeps the small community going. Development of the new Star Trek: Online title is complete and the game was made available for sale on February 2, 2010.

Star Trek: Alien Domain is a 2015 flash-based Star Trek multiplayer strategy game developed by GameSamba in conjunction with CBS Interactive.

Commercial games

Console

Mobile

Electronic and casino games 
 Star Trek Super Phaser 2 Target Game is similar to Laser Tag (1976)
 Star Trek Phaser Battle Game is similar a tabletop arcade game
 Star Trek is a casino slot machine game designed and marketed by WMS Industries since 2008
Star Trek: Deep Space Nine – Red Alert, video game gambling machine.

Handheld electronic games 
Numerous stand-alone electronic handheld and tabletop games have been produced by manufacturers like Bandai, Coleco, Konami, and others. Pair Match, manufactured by Bandai in 1984, appeared in several Star Trek: The Next Generation episodes.

See also 

Netrek
List of games in Star Trek
The Warp Factor

References

Further reading 

 Hailing Frequency Star Trek Gaming News - A community website with news and interviews about Star Trek Gaming. A bi-weekly podcast and live radio show, forums with over 5000 members.
 TrekCore Gaming Museum - Information on all Star Trek games, by platform, and includes Current online games.

External links 
 Current online games, at trekcore.com.
 20Q Star Trek - An online artificial intelligence game that covers all classic Star Trek TV shows and movies, plus characters, gadgets and locations

 
Lists of video games by franchise